
The Bar D Wranglers are a stage performance quartet presenting a blend of Western music, cowboy poetry, and rollicking Western humor. They are based at their chuckwagon-style restaurant near Durango, Colorado, and perform there and at mostly regional venues. They have performed internationally in Japan.

History
The group formed in 1969 in conjunction with the Bar D Chuckwagon, their outdoor restaurant near Durango. The founder was Cy Scarborough who served as the general manager until his death in 2020. Other founders were Jim Blanton and Buck Teeter. The restaurant has been open every summer evening since then. The Wranglers have entertained over 2.5 million people there and on countless stages around the U.S. The band members have changed over the years, with many performers spending decades with the group. One of the current members, Gary Cook, has been with the group since 1989. He has twice been named the national flatpicking champion guitar player.

Performances
The Wranglers traditionally present a well-received cowboy Christmas show at venues in Colorado and neighboring states. They are traditionally well received at selective art-friendly venues in Sedona, Arizona and the Walnut Valley Festival in Winfield, Kansas. In 2008, they played to an audience of 35,000 at a cherry blossom festival near Naval Air Facility Atsugi, Japan. After the festival, they gave intimate living room concerts for pilots and their families from the USS Kitty Hawk.

The Bar D Wranglers have recorded six CDs and two DVDs.

References 

Durango, Colorado
American folk musical groups
Musical groups established in 1969